Amorematico is an album released by the Italian rock band Subsonica in 2002.

Track listing
 "Nuvole Rapide"
 "Albascura"       
 "Dentro i miei vuoti"
 "Eva-Eva"
 "Nuova Ossessione"
 "Mammifero"
 "Sole Silenzioso"
 "Ieri"
 "Gente Tranquilla"
 "Questo domani"
 "Atmosferico I"
 "Atmosferico II"
 "Atmosferico III"
 "Atmosferico IV"

2002 albums
Subsonica albums
Italian-language albums